A greenhouse (also called a glasshouse, or, if with sufficient heating, a hothouse) is a structure with walls and roof made chiefly of transparent material, such as glass, in which plants requiring regulated climatic conditions are grown.These structures range in size from small sheds to industrial-sized buildings. A miniature greenhouse is known as a cold frame. The interior of a greenhouse exposed to sunlight becomes significantly warmer than the external temperature, protecting its contents in cold weather.

Many commercial glass greenhouses or hothouses are high tech production facilities for vegetables, flowers or fruits. The glass greenhouses are filled with equipment including screening installations, heating, cooling, and lighting, and may be controlled by a computer to optimize conditions for plant growth. Different techniques are then used to manage growing conditions, including air temperature, relative humidity and vapour-pressure deficit, in order to provide the optimum environment for cultivation of a specific crop.

History

The idea of growing plants in environmentally controlled areas has existed since Roman times. The Roman emperor Tiberius ate a cucumber-like vegetable daily.   The Roman gardeners used artificial methods (similar to the greenhouse system) of growing to have it available for his table every day of the year. Cucumbers were planted in wheeled carts which were put in the sun daily, then taken inside to keep them warm at night. The cucumbers were stored under frames or in cucumber houses glazed with either oiled cloth known as specularia or with sheets of selenite (a.k.a. lapis specularis), according to the description by Pliny the Elder.

The first description of a heated greenhouse is from the Sanga Yorok, a treatise on husbandry compiled by a royal physician of the Joseon dynasty of Korea during the 1450s, in its chapter on cultivating vegetables during winter. The treatise contains detailed instructions on constructing a greenhouse that is capable of cultivating vegetables, forcing flowers, and ripening fruit within an artificially heated environment, by utilizing ondol, the traditional Korean underfloor heating system, to maintain heat and humidity; cob walls to retain heat; and semi-transparent oiled hanji windows to permit light penetration for plant growth and provide protection from the outside environment. The Annals of the Joseon Dynasty confirm that greenhouse-like structures incorporating ondol were constructed to provide heat for mandarin orange trees during the winter of 1438.

The concept of greenhouses also appeared in the Netherlands and then England in the 17th century, along with the plants. Some of these early attempts required enormous amounts of work to close up at night or to winterize. There were serious problems with providing adequate and balanced heat in these early greenhouses. The first 'stove' (heated) greenhouse in the UK was completed at Chelsea Physic Garden by 1681. Today, the Netherlands has many of the largest greenhouses in the world, some of them so vast that they are able to produce millions of vegetables every year.

Experimentation with greenhouse design continued during the 17th century in Europe, as technology produced better glass and construction techniques improved.

The French botanist Charles Lucien Bonaparte is often credited with building the first practical modern greenhouse in Leiden, Holland, during the 1800s to grow medicinal tropical plants.
Originally only on the estates of the rich, the growth of the science of botany caused greenhouses to spread to the universities. The French called their first greenhouses orangeries, since they were used to protect orange trees from freezing. As pineapples became popular, pineries, or pineapple pits, were built.

19th century

The golden era of the greenhouse was in England during the Victorian era, where the largest glasshouses yet conceived were constructed; ones with sufficient height for sizeable trees were often called palm houses.  These were normally in public gardens and parks.  These were a stage in the 19th-century development of glass and iron architecture, which was also widely used in railway stations, markets, exhibition halls, and other large buildings needing a large and open internal area.  One of the earliest examples of a palm house is in the Belfast Botanic Gardens. Designed by Charles Lanyon, the building was completed in 1840. It was constructed by iron-maker Richard Turner, who would later build the Palm House, Kew Gardens at the Royal Botanic Gardens, Kew, London,  in 1848.  This came shortly after the Chatsworth Great Conservatory (1837-40) and shortly before The Crystal Palace (1851), both designed by Joseph Paxton, and both now lost.  

Other large greenhouses built in the 19th century included the New York Crystal Palace, Munich’s Glaspalast and the Royal Greenhouses of Laeken (1874–1895) for King Leopold II of Belgium.  In Japan, the first greenhouse was built in 1880 by Samuel Cocking, a British merchant who exported herbs.

20th century

In the 20th century, the geodesic dome was added to the many types of greenhouses. Notable examples are the Eden Project in Cornwall, The Rodale Institute  in Pennsylvania, the Climatron at the Missouri Botanical Garden in St. Louis, Missouri, and Toyota Motor Manufacturing Kentucky.  The pyramid is another popular shape for large, high greenhouses; there are  several pyramidal greenhouses at the Muttart Conservatory in Alberta (c, 1976).  

Greenhouse structures adapted in the 1960s when wider sheets of polyethylene (polythene) film became widely available. Hoop houses were made by several companies and were also frequently made by the growers themselves. Constructed of aluminum extrusions, special galvanized steel tubing, or even just lengths of steel or PVC water pipe, construction costs were greatly reduced. This resulted in many more greenhouses being constructed on smaller farms and garden centers. Polyethylene film durability increased greatly when more effective UV-inhibitors were developed and added in the 1970s; these extended the usable life of the film from one or two years up to three and eventually four or more years.

Gutter-connected greenhouses became more prevalent in the 1980s and 1990s. These greenhouses have two or more bays connected by a common wall, or row of support posts. Heating inputs were reduced as the ratio of floor area to exterior wall area was increased substantially. Gutter-connected greenhouses are now commonly used both in production and in situations where plants are grown and sold to the public as well. Gutter-connected greenhouses are commonly covered with structured polycarbonate materials, or a double layer of polyethylene film with air blown between to provide increased heating efficiencies.

Theory of operation 
The warmer temperature in a greenhouse occurs because incident solar radiation passes through the transparent roof and walls and is absorbed by the floor, earth, and contents, which become warmer.  These in turn warm up the surrounding air within the greenhouse.  As the structure is not open to the atmosphere, the warmed air cannot escape via convection due to the presence of roof and walls, so the temperature inside the greenhouse rises. 

This differs from the earth-oriented theory known as the "greenhouse effect",, which is a reduction in a planet's heat loss through radiation.

Quantitative studies suggest that the effect of infrared radiative cooling is not negligibly small, and may have economic implications in a heated greenhouse. Analysis of issues of near-infrared radiation in a greenhouse with screens of a high coefficient of reflection concluded that installation of such screens reduced heat demand by about 8%, and application of dyes to transparent surfaces was suggested. Composite less-reflective glass, or less effective but cheaper anti-reflective coated simple glass, also produced savings.

Ventilation 
Ventilation is one of the most important components in a successful greenhouse. If there is no proper ventilation, greenhouses and their growing plants can become prone to problems. The main purposes of ventilation is to regulate the temperature and humidity to the optimal level, and to ensure movement of air and thus prevent the build-up of plant pathogens (such as Botrytis cinerea) that prefer still air conditions. Ventilation also ensures a supply of fresh air for photosynthesis and plant respiration, and may enable important pollinators to access the greenhouse crop.

Ventilation can be achieved via the use of vents – often controlled automatically via a computer – and recirculation fans.

Heating 

Heating or electricity is one of the most considerable costs in the operation of greenhouses across the globe, especially in colder climates. The main problem with heating a greenhouse as opposed to a building that has solid opaque walls is the amount of heat lost through the greenhouse covering. Since the coverings need to allow light to filter into the structure, they conversely cannot insulate very well. With traditional plastic greenhouse coverings having an R-value of around 2, a great amount of money is therefore spent to continually replace the heat lost. Most greenhouses, when supplemental heat is needed use natural gas or electric furnaces.

Passive heating methods exist which seek heat using low energy input. Solar energy can be captured from periods of relative abundance (day time/summer), and released to boost the temperature during cooler periods (night time/winter). Waste heat from livestock can also be used to heat greenhouses, e.g., placing a chicken coop inside a greenhouse recovers the heat generated by the chickens, which would otherwise be wasted. Some greenhouses also rely on geothermal heating.

Cooling 

Cooling is typically done by opening windows in the greenhouse when it gets too warm for the plants inside it. This can be done manually, or in an automated manner. Window actuators can open windows due to temperature difference or can be opened by electronic controllers. Electronic controllers are often used to monitor the temperature and adjusts the furnace operation to the conditions. This can be as simple as a basic thermostat, but can be more complicated in larger greenhouse operations.

For very hot situations, a shade house providing cooling by shade may be used.

Lighting
During the day, light enters the greenhouse via the windows and is used by the plants. Some greenhouses are also equipped with grow lights (often LED lights) which are switched on at night to increase the amount of light the plants get, hereby increasing the yield with certain crops.

Carbon dioxide enrichment 

The benefits of carbon dioxide enrichment to about 1100 parts per million in greenhouse cultivation to enhance plant growth has been known for nearly 100 years. After the development of equipment for the controlled serial enrichment of carbon dioxide, the technique was established on a broad scale in the Netherlands. Secondary metabolites, e.g., cardiac glycosides in Digitalis lanata, are produced in higher amounts by greenhouse cultivation at enhanced temperature and at enhanced carbon dioxide concentration. Carbon dioxide enrichment can also reduce greenhouse water usage by a significant fraction by mitigating the total air-flow needed to supply adequate carbon for plant growth and thereby reducing the quantity of water lost to evaporation. Commercial greenhouses are now frequently located near appropriate industrial facilities for mutual benefit. For example, Cornerways Nursery in the UK is strategically placed near a major sugar refinery, consuming both waste heat and CO2 from the refinery which would otherwise be vented to atmosphere. The refinery reduces its carbon emissions, whilst the nursery enjoys boosted tomato yields and does not need to provide its own greenhouse heating.

Enrichment only becomes effective where, by Liebig's law, carbon dioxide has become the limiting factor. In a controlled greenhouse, irrigation may be trivial, and soils may be fertile by default. In less-controlled gardens and open fields, rising CO2 levels only increase primary production to the point of soil depletion (assuming no droughts, flooding, or both), as demonstrated prima facie by CO2 levels continuing to rise.  In addition, laboratory experiments, free air carbon enrichment (FACE) test plots, and field measurements provide replicability.

Types 

In domestic greenhouses, the glass used is typically 3mm (or ⅛″) 'horticultural glass' grade, which is good quality glass that should not contain air bubbles (which can produce scorching on leaves by acting like lenses).

Plastics mostly used are polyethylene film and multiwall sheets of polycarbonate material, or PMMA acrylic glass.

Commercial glass greenhouses are often high-tech production facilities for vegetables or flowers. The glass greenhouses are filled with equipment such as screening installations, heating, cooling and lighting, and may be automatically controlled by a computer.

Dutch Light
In the UK and other Northern European countries a pane of horticultural glass referred to as "Dutch Light" was historically used as a standard unit of construction, having dimensions of 28¾″ x 56″ (approx. 730 mm x 1422 mm). This size gives a larger glazed area when compared with using smaller panes such as the 600 mm width typically used in modern domestic designs which then require more supporting framework for a given overall greenhouse size. A style of greenhouse having sloped sides (resulting in a wider base than at eaves height) and using these panes uncut is also often referred to as of "Dutch Light design", and a cold frame using a full- or half-pane as being of "Dutch" or "half-Dutch" size.

Greenhouses with spectrally selective solar modules

Uses 
Greenhouses allow for greater control over the growing environment of plants. Depending upon the technical specification of a greenhouse, key factors which may be controlled include temperature, levels of light and shade, irrigation, fertilizer application, and atmospheric humidity. Greenhouses may be used to overcome shortcomings in the growing qualities of a piece of land, such as a short growing season or poor light levels, and they can thereby improve food production in marginal environments.  Shade houses are used specifically to provide shade in hot, dry climates.

As they may enable certain crops to be grown throughout the year, greenhouses are increasingly important in the food supply of high-latitude countries. One of the largest complexes in the world is in Almería, Andalucía, Spain, where greenhouses cover almost .

Greenhouses are often used for growing flowers, vegetables, fruits, and transplants. Special greenhouse varieties of certain crops, such as tomatoes, are generally used for commercial production.

Many vegetables and flowers can be grown in greenhouses in late winter and early spring, and then transplanted outside as the weather warms. Seed tray racks can also be used to stack seed trays inside the greenhouse for later transplanting outside. Hydroponics (especially hydroponic A-frames) can be used to make the most use of the interior space when growing crops to mature size inside the greenhouse.

Bumblebees can be used as pollinators for pollination, but other types of bees have also been used, as well as artificial pollination.

The relatively closed environment of a greenhouse has its own unique management requirements, compared with outdoor production. Pests and diseases, and extremes of temperature and humidity, have to be controlled, and irrigation is necessary to provide water. Most greenhouses use sprinklers or drip lines. Significant inputs of heat and light may be required, particularly with winter production of warm-weather vegetables.

Greenhouses also have applications outside of the agriculture industry. GlassPoint Solar, located in Fremont, California, encloses solar fields in greenhouses to produce steam for solar-enhanced oil recovery. For example, in November 2017 GlassPoint announced that it is developing a solar enhanced oil recovery facility near Bakersfield, CA that uses greenhouses to enclose its parabolic troughs.

An "alpine house" is a specialized greenhouse used for growing alpine plants. The purpose of an alpine house is to mimic the conditions in which alpine plants grow; particularly to provide protection from wet conditions in winter. Alpine houses are often unheated, since the plants grown there are hardy, or require at most protection from hard frost in the winter. They are designed to have excellent ventilation.

Adoption 
Worldwide, there are an estimated nine million acres of greenhouses.

Netherlands

The Netherlands has some of the largest greenhouses in the world. Such is the scale of food production in the country that in 2017, greenhouses occupied nearly 5,000 hectares.

Greenhouses began to be built in the Westland region of the Netherlands in the mid-19th century. The addition of sand to bogs and clay soil created fertile soil for agriculture, and around 1850, grapes were grown in the first greenhouses, simple glass constructions with one of the sides consisting of a solid wall. By the early 20th century, greenhouses began to be constructed with all sides built using glass, and they began to be heated. This also allowed for the production of fruits and vegetables that did not ordinarily grow in the area. Today, the Westland and the area around Aalsmeer have the highest concentration of greenhouse agriculture in the world. The Westland produces mostly vegetables, besides plants and flowers; Aalsmeer is noted mainly for the production of flowers and potted plants. Since the 20th century, the area around Venlo and parts of Drenthe have also become important regions for greenhouse agriculture.

Since 2000, technical innovations include the "closed greenhouse", a completely closed system allowing the grower complete control over the growing process while using less energy. Floating greenhouses are used in watery areas of the country.

The Netherlands has around 4,000 greenhouse enterprises that operate over 9,000 hectares of greenhouses and employ some 150,000 workers, producing €7.2 billion worth of vegetables, fruit, plants, and flowers, some 80% of which is exported.

See also 

 Bioshelter
 Biosphere 2
 Conservatory (greenhouse)
 Floriculture
 Greenhouse gas
 High tunnel
 IBTS Greenhouse
 Phytotron
 Plasticulture
 Row cover
 Seasonal thermal energy storage
 Seawater greenhouse
 Sunroom
 Tessellated roof
 Vertical farming
 Winter garden

Citations

General and cited references 
 Cunningham, Anne S. (2000). Crystal palaces: garden conservatories of the United States. Princeton Architectural Press, New York, 
 Francesco Pona: Il Paradiso de' Fiori overo Lo archetipo de' Giardini, 1622 Angelo Tamo, Verona (a manual of gardening with use greenhouse for make Giardino all'italiana)
 Pevsner, Nikolaus. A History of Building Types, Thames and Hudson, 1976 (1984 ed.), .
 Valera, D. L.; Belmonte, L.J.; Molina, F.D.; López, A. (2016). Greenhouse agriculture in Almería. A comprehensive techno-economic analysis. Ed. Cajamar Caja Rural. 408pp.
 
 Vleeschouwer, Olivier de (2001). Greenhouses and conservatories. Flammarion, Paris, .

Further reading

External links 
 

 
Agricultural buildings
Garden features
Horticulture